The 1948 United States Senate election in South Dakota took place on November 2, 1948. Incumbent Republican Senator Harlan J. Bushfield, suffering from poor health, declined to run for re-election. On September 27, 1948, he died in office; his wife, Vera C. Bushfield, was appointed to succeed him. Congressman Karl E. Mundt easily won the Republican primary and advanced to the general election, where he was opposed by Democratic nominee John A. Engel, an attorney. Hundt defeated Engel in a landslide.

Democratic Primary
John A. Engel, an attorney from Avon, was the only Democratic candidate to file for the U.S. Senate and he won the nomination unopposed, thereby removing it from the primary election ballot.

Republican Primary

Candidates
 Karl E. Mundt, U.S. Congressman from South Dakota's 1st congressional district
 Otto B. Lindstad, State Senator, former Assistant State Attorney General

Results

General election

Results

References

South Dakota
1948
1948 South Dakota elections